Footsteps: Adventures of a Romantic Biographer is an autobiographical book by the biographer Richard Holmes, published in 1985. Harper Perennial first published reprints of Footsteps in 2005.

Footnotes

References 

 
 
 
 
 
 
 
 
 

1985 non-fiction books
British autobiographies
English-language books
Hodder & Stoughton books